Coeligena is a genus of South American hummingbirds.

It contains the following 15 species:
 Bronzy inca (Coeligena coeligena)
 Brown inca (Coeligena wilsoni)
 Black inca (Coeligena prunellei)
 Green inca (Coeligena conradii)
 Collared inca (Coeligena torquata)
 Gould's inca (Coeligena inca)
 White-tailed starfrontlet (Coeligena phalerata)
 Dusky starfrontlet (Coeligena orina)
 Blue-throated starfrontlet (Coeligena helianthea)
 Golden-bellied starfrontlet (Coeligena bonapartei)
 Golden-tailed starfrontlet (Coeligena eos)
 Buff-winged starfrontlet (Coeligena lutetiae)
 Perija starfrontlet (Coeligena consita)
 Violet-throated starfrontlet (Coeligena violifer)
 Rainbow starfrontlet (Coeligena iris)

References

 
Bird genera
 
Taxa named by René Lesson
Taxonomy articles created by Polbot